K34 or K-34 may refer to:
 K-34 (Kansas highway)
 Gardner Municipal Airport (Kansas)
 , a corvette of the Royal Australian Navy
 , a corvette of the Royal Navy
 , a corvette of the Swedish Navy
 Keratin 34
 Makubetsu Station, in Hokkaido, Japan
 Potassium-34, an isotope of potassium